The , promulgated on June 14, 2006, is the main statute codifying securities law and regulating securities companies in Japan.

The law provides for:

 Registration and regulation of broker dealers and their registered representatives
 Disclosure obligations applicable to public companies, investment trusts and similar entities
 Tender offer rules
 Disclosure obligations applicable to large shareholders in public companies
 Internal controls in public companies; in this role the law is often referred to as J-SOX, a reference to the American Sarbanes-Oxley Act (SOX).

Summary 
The Act for the Amendment of the Securities and Exchange Act, etc. was passed at the 164th session of the Diet, reforming the 1946 Securities and Exchange Act, and updating the act's name to Financial Instruments and Exchange Act (FIEA). This law also abolished the Financial Futures Trading Act and three other laws, incorporating their regulations into the FIEA. The law had three major aims: to encourage the use of financial services and instruments by extending consumer protects and increasing convenience; to increase perceived reliability in the securities market by enacting rules to ensure fairness and transparency; to reform the existing laws to conform to international standards in an increasingly globalized market. Based on these aims, the law developed four main pillars.

 Establishing a cross-sectional legislative framework for investor protection covering financial products with strong investment characteristics (the so-called legal framework for investor services)
 Enhancing disclosure requirements
 Ensuring appropriate management of self-regulatory operations by exchanges
 Strict countermeasures against unfair trading

J-SOX provisions
The internal control portions of the FIEA were largely enacted in response to corporate scandals such as the Kanebo, Livedoor, and Murakami Fund episodes.

The Internal Control Committee of the Business Accounting Council of the Japanese Financial Services Agency provided final Implementation Guidance for Management Assessment and Audit of Internal Controls over Financial Reporting (ICFR) in February 2007. The Implementation Guidance provides details to Japanese companies on how to implement a Management Assessment of Internal Control over Financial Reporting as required under the Financial Instruments and Exchange Law.

The Financial Instruments and Exchange Act became effective in April 2008 for roughly 3,800 companies listed in Japan, along with their foreign subsidiaries.

Forrester Research lists the following challenges and differences between J-SOX and SOX:
 Professional services. Japan has fewer than 10% of the number of qualified accountants than the US. 
 Independence of auditors. While the concept of auditor independence exists in the Japanese market similar to the US, many Japanese firms can and will rely on the influence and recommendations of their audit firms. 
 Audit automation is critical. With the extreme shortage of auditors compared to US per capita numbers, this shortage will increase the requirement and necessity for process efficiency in the internal audit process and software that can support these processes. 
 Support of IT governance. In the November guidance regarding the scope of the J-SOX process, it is clear that IT controls are a central point of focus for J-SOX

See also
 Policy 52-109 – Canadian version of Sarbanes-Oxley Act
 Keeping the Promise for a Strong Economy Act (Budget Measures), 2002 – specifically for Ontario
 CLERP-9 – Australian version of the act
 Data Loss Prevention

References

External links
 What is the Japanese Sarbanes Oxley
 IT Braces for J-SOX Rules
 Financial Instruments and Exchange Act : Financial Services Agency

Audit legislation
Corporate governance
Japanese business law